Jan-Erik Lundqvist was the defending champion, but did not compete in the 1968 edition of the tournament. Ken Rosewall became the first men's singles winner of an open era tennis tournament after defeating Rod Laver in the final.

Seeds

 Rod Laver (finals)
 Ken Rosewall (champion)
 Andrés Gimeno (semifinals)
 Pancho Gonzales (second round)
 Roy Emerson (quarterfinals)
 Fred Stolle (quarterfinals)
 Owen Davidson (quarterfinals)
 Robert Wilson (quarterfinals)

Draw

Finals

Top half

Bottom half

References

External links

British Hard Court Championships
1968 in English tennis